Baron Joseph (Josse) Marie Honoré Charles Mertens de Wilmars (22 June 1912 – 1 August 2002) was a Belgian jurist who became a member of the European Court of Justice and then its sixth President.

Biography 
Mertens de Wilmars was born in Sint-Niklaas, into a family of brewers.  One of his brothers was the psychiatrist Charles Mertens de Wilmars.  He gained a degree in law in 1934, and practiced in Antwerp, specialising in administrative law.  He was an officer in the Belgian Army in the Second World War, and spent most of the war as a prisoner of war.  After the war, he was a member of the Belgian Catholic alliance, and was a member of the Belgian parliament from 1951 to 1962.  He was in favour of European unity, and attended the Congress in the Hague in 1948. He also taught administrative law at the High Institute for Administrative Sciences in Antwerp from 1946 to 1967, and was an associate professor in law at the Catholic University of Leuven from 1971.

He became a member of the European Court of Justice in 1967, and served as its sixth President from 1980 to 1984.

He died in Antwerp.

See also
List of members of the European Court of Justice

External links
European Court of Justice Official site
Obituary, 5 September 2002
Biography (German)
 Josse Mertens de Wilmars in ODIS – Online Database for Intermediary Structures

1912 births
2002 deaths
20th-century Belgian judges
Presidents of the European Court of Justice
People from Sint-Niklaas
Grand Crosses 1st class of the Order of Merit of the Federal Republic of Germany
Belgian judges of international courts and tribunals
Belgian prisoners of war in World War II
Belgian Army officers